The Portalegre Football Association (Associação de Futebol de Portalegre, abrv. AF Portalegre) is the district governing body for the all football competitions in the Portuguese district of Portalegre. It is also the regulator of the clubs registered in the district.

Notable clubs in the Portalegre FA

 SC Campomaiorense
 Eléctrico FC
 Estrela de Portalegre
 O Elvas CAD

Current divisions - 2022/23 season

The AF Portalegre runs the following division covering the fifth tier of the Portuguese football league system.

1ª divisão

Clube de Futebol  Os Gavionenses
Eléctrico Futebol Clube
Futebol Clube Mosteirense
Grupo Desportivo e Recreativo Gafetense
O Elvas Clube Alentejano de Desportos
Villa Athletic Club (dropped out)

See also
 Portuguese District Football Associations
 Portuguese football competitions
 List of football clubs in Portugal

References 

Portalegre